Shi Yi may refer to:

 Shi Yi (士壹), a younger brother of the Han dynasty warlord Shi Xie
 Shi Yi (Eastern Wu) (是儀), Eastern Wu official of the Three Kingdoms period
 Ten Wings (十翼; Shi Yi), the classical commentaries to the Book of Changes.